Kuheh-ye Yek (also Romanized as Kūheh-ye Yek; also known as Kūheh and Kūh Ha) is a village in Jahad Rural District, Hamidiyeh District, Ahvaz County, Khuzestan Province, Iran. At the 2006 census, its population was 166, in 26 families.

References 

Populated places in Ahvaz County